Farsi Island is a tiny, barren Iranian island (Bushehr province) in the Persian Gulf. There is an IRGC Navy base on this island. The word Farsi means "Persian".

In the late 1980s, during the "Tanker War" phase of the Iran–Iraq War, the IRGC used speedboats to launch attacks from Farsi Island on vessels of Iraq and its allies, including Kuwait. The United States entered the Persian gulf to protect Kuwaiti oil shipments. Iran planted naval mines near Farsi Island on the route of the first convoy, consisted of US navy vessels escorting the Kuwaiti oil tanker Bridgeton, which hit one of the mines.

On January 12, 2016, Iranian Revolutionary Guards forces stationed at the island apprehended two small vessels and their 10 U.S. Navy sailors after the latter entered Iranian waters. The incident prompted talks between the Iranian Foreign Ministry and the U.S. State Department regarding their release. All 10 sailors and their vessels were released unharmed the following morning.

See also 

 List of lighthouses in Iran
 Nader Mahdavi
 2016 U.S.–Iran naval incident

References

External links 
 Low resolution satellite imagery on Flash Earth

Islands of Iran
Landforms of Bushehr Province
Islands of the Persian Gulf
Lighthouses in Iran